Henk Jaap Beentje (born 1951, Bakkum) is a Dutch botanist. In 1978 he obtained a masters in biology at the University of Amsterdam. He obtained his PhD at the Wageningen Agricultural University on the thesis A monograph on Strophanthus DC. (Apocynaceae), prepared under the direction of Hendrik de Wit and A.J.M. Leeuwenberg, in 1982.

Since 1975, Beentje has been active in Africa. Between 1984 and 1989, he was a research fellow at the East African Herbarium, a herbarium that is part of the National Museums of Kenya in Kenya.

Since 1995, Beentje has been a researcher at the herbarium of the Royal Botanic Gardens, Kew. He is particularly engaged in research of mainly African species from the Composite and the Palm families. In the area of the palms, he has often collaborated with John Dransfield. Beentje also serves as an editor of the publication series Flora of Tropical East Africa. He is a Fellow of the Linnean Society of London.

Selected publications
A Field Guide to the Acacias of Kenya, Malcolm Coe, Henk Beentje & Rosemary Wise, Oxford University Press (1992), 
Kenya Trees, Shrubs, and Lianas, Henk Beentje, Joy Adamson & Dhan Bhanderi, National Museums of Kenya (1994), 
The Palms of Madagascar, John Dransfield, Henk Beentje, Margaret Tebbs & Rosemary Wise, Royal Botanic Gardens, Kew (1995), 
Field Guide to the Palms of Madagascar, John Dransfield, Henk Beentje, Adam Britt, Tianjanahary Ranarivelo & Jeremie Razafitsalama, Kew Publishing (2006),

References

External links 
Information about the thesis of Henk J. Beentje
Curriculum Vitae of Henk Beentje at the Royal Botanic Gardens, Kew

1951 births
Living people
Botanists active in Kew Gardens
20th-century Dutch botanists
21st-century Dutch botanists
Fellows of the Linnean Society of London
People from Castricum
University of Amsterdam alumni
Wageningen University and Research alumni